Carlos Taberner was the defending champion but lost in the quarterfinals to Tseng Chun-hsin.

Manuel Guinard won the title after defeating Tseng 6–1, 6–2 in the final.

Seeds

Draw

Finals

Top half

Bottom half

References

External links
Main draw
Qualifying draw

Challenger di Roseto degli Abruzzi II - 1